Pseudomelatoma is a genus of predatory sea snails, marine gastropod mollusks in the family Pseudomelatomidae.

Description
(Original description) There is a group of species typified by Pleurotoma penicillata Carpenter which in sculpture and periostracum closely resemble the African Melatoma but their operculum has an apical nucleus and is long and narrow. They may be called Pseudomelatoma. Melatoma Anthony, 1847, is quite a different thing.

Species
Species within the genus Pseudomelatoma include:
 Pseudomelatoma eburnea (Carpenter, 1865)
 Pseudomelatoma moesta (Carpenter, 1864)
 Pseudomelatoma penicillata (Carpenter, 1864)
 Pseudomelatoma sticta S. S. Berry, 1956
 Pseudomelatoma torosa (Carpenter, 1864)
Species brought into synonymy
 Pseudomelatoma grippi (Dall, 1919): synonym of Ophiodermella grippi (Dall, 1919)
 Pseudomelatoma redondoensis T. Burch, 1938: synonym of Burchia semiinflata (Grant & Gale, 1931) (original combination)

References

External links
 
 Bouchet, P.; Kantor, Y. I.; Sysoev, A.; Puillandre, N. (2011). A new operational classification of the Conoidea (Gastropoda). Journal of Molluscan Studies. 77(3): 273-308
 Worldwide Mollusc Species Data Base: Pseudomelatomidae

 
Pseudomelatomidae
Gastropod genera